James O'Rourke may refer to:

Sports
 Jim O'Rourke (baseball) (1850–1919), American baseball player and Hall of Fame inductee
 Jimmy O'Rourke (baseball) (1883–1955), American baseball player, son of the Hall of Fame inductee
 James O'Rourke (canoeist) (1915–1983), American canoeist who competed at the 1936 Summer Olympics
 James O'Rourke Jr. (born 1942), his son, American sprint canoeist
 Jimmy O'Rourke (footballer) (1946–2022), Scottish footballer

Others
 Jim O'Rourke (musician) (born 1969), American musician and filmmaker
 Jim O'Rourke (politician), American politician